Ammoconia senex is a moth of the family Noctuidae. It is found in the European part of the Mediterranean Region and an isolated population near the Middle Rhine. It is also found in Turkey, the Caucasus, Iraq and Iran.

The wingspan is 36–46 mm. Adults are on wing from September to October or November.

The larvae feed on various low-growing plants, including Plantago and Taraxacum.

Subspecies
Ammoconia senex senex (northern Mediterranean Region)
Ammoconia senex mediorhenana Fuchs, 1879 (Middle Rhine)
Ammoconia senex typhoea Turati, 1909 (Sicily)
Ammoconia senex wagneri  (Boursin, 1935)  (Bulgaria)
Ammoconia senex victoris Ronkay & Varga, 1994 (Turkey)
Ammoconia senex rjabovi Ronkay & Varga, 1984 (Dagestan)
Ammoconia senex transhamadanensis Gyulai & Ronkay, 2006 (Iran)

References

External links 

 Fauna Europaea
 Lepiforum.de
 schmetterlinge-deutschlands.de

Xyleninae
Moths of Europe
Moths described in 1828
Moths of the Middle East
Taxa named by Carl Geyer